Klever Rêgo Loureiro (born February 20, 1952) is a Brazilian judge and the president of the Court of Justice of Alagoas.

Between April 2 and May 15, 2022, he served as interim governor of the state of Alagoas.

Life 
Loureiro was born on February 20, 1952, in Recife, capital of the state of Pernambuco.

On April 2, 2022, he became interim governor of Alagoas, until the inauguration of the elected official in an indirect election to be held in 30 days. Paulo Dantas was elected by the Legislative Assembly of Alagoas as his successor on May 15, 2022.

The post was vacant after Renan Filho's resignation to run for the Federal Senate. The former Vice Governor, Luciano Barbosa, had already resigned in order to take office as the Mayor of Arapiraca in 2021. In addition, the president of the Legislative Assembly of Alagoas, Marcelo Victor, who was supposed to take over by the line of succession, abstained from doing it because taking over the executive position would prevent him from being reelected as a state deputy in the 2022 Brazilian general election.

References 

|-

Living people
1952 births
Governors of Alagoas